Samaris is a genus of crested flounders native to the Indo-Pacific.

Species
There are currently five recognized species in this genus:
 Samaris chesterfieldensis Mihara & Amaoka, 2004
 Samaris costae Quéro, Hensley & Maugé, 1989
 Samaris cristatus J. E. Gray, 1831 (Cockatoo righteye flounder)
 Samaris macrolepis Norman, 1927 (Large-scale crested righteye flounder)
 Samaris spinea Mihara & Amaoka, 2004

References

Samaridae
Marine fish genera
Taxa named by John Edward Gray